Thuli–Manyange (Elliot) Dam is proposed a reservoir on the Thuli River, south of Gwanda, Zimbabwe with a capacity of 33 million cubic metres. It is designed to be co-operated with Thuli–Moswa Dam

References

Thuli River
Dams in Zimbabwe
Shashe River
Gwanda District
Proposed infrastructure in Zimbabwe
Proposed dams